Oxetane, or 1,3-propylene oxide, is a heterocyclic organic compound with the molecular formula , having a four-membered ring with three carbon atoms and one oxygen atom.

The term "an oxetane" or "oxetanes" refer to any organic compound containing the oxetane ring.

Production
A typical well-known method of preparation is the reaction of potassium hydroxide with 3-chloropropyl acetate at 150 °C:

Yield of oxetane made this way is c. 40%, as the synthesis can lead to a variety of by-products.

Another possible reaction to form an oxetane ring is the Paternò–Büchi reaction.  The oxetane ring can also be formed through diol cyclization as well as through decarboxylation of a six-membered cyclic carbonate.

Taxol
 
Paclitaxel (Taxol) is an example of a natural product containing an oxetane ring. Taxol has become a major point of interest among researchers due to its unusual structure and success in the involvement of cancer treatment. The attached oxetane ring is an important feature that is used for the binding of microtubules in structure activity; however little is known about how the reaction is catalyzed in nature, which creates a challenge for scientists trying to synthesize the product.

See also
β-Propiolactone or 2-oxetanone.
3-Oxetanone

Derivatives 
More than a hundred different oxetanes have been synthesized. Functional groups can be added into any desired position in the oxetane ring, including fully fluorinated (perfluoronated) and fully deuterated analoques. Major examples are listed in table below.

References